D42 state road, connecting Gorski Kotar and Lika regions of Croatia, and cities and towns of Vrbovsko, Josipdol and Ogulin, to the state road network of Croatia, and most notably to A6 and A1 Vrbovsko and Ogulin interchanges respectively. The route comprises a significant number of urban intersections, in segment of the road running through Ogulin.

The road, as well as all other state roads in Croatia, is managed and maintained by Hrvatske ceste, a state-owned company.

Traffic volume 

Traffic is regularly counted and reported by Hrvatske ceste, operator of the road.

Road junctions and populated areas

Maps

Sources

D042
D042
D042
D042